J. Schmalz GmbH was founded as a razor blade factory in 1910 in Glatten in the Black Forest. Over the years, the company's products changed from razor blades to transport equipment and finally to vacuum technology.

The company is one of the leading suppliers of vacuum technology in the fields of automation and manual handling and clamping. Schmalz employs more than 950 people (2015). The company's sales network includes 16 subsidiaries in China, Finland, France, India, Italy, Japan, Canada, Korea, Mexico, the Netherlands, Poland, Russia, Switzerland, Spain, Turkey and the United States.

History 
In 1910, Johannes Schmalz founded the “Johannes Schmalz Rasierklingenfabrik” in Glatten. The “Glattis” brand was both well-known and successful in Germany, selling up to 600,000 razor blades every month.
The proliferation of the electric shaver required the company to change its focus. From 1948 onwards, Artur Schmalz made innovative developments in the field of light motor vehicles. Schmalz supplied luggage trailers and mobile steps to airports and transport equipment to furniture factories.
When Kurt Schmalz took over the management of the company in 1984, the company moved in a new direction and began to specialise in vacuum technology. In 1990, Wolfgang Schmalz joined the company's management. Together, the two brothers have transformed a company with a long tradition into an international company.

1998 saw the opening of the company's first branch office in Switzerland. Today, Schmalz has a sales network of 17 branch offices across the globe. In 2008, the company's production area in Germany was increased by 10,170 m².

Products 
Schmalz's vacuum technology is utilized in production processes that require workpieces to be moved, ergonomically transported, or secured.
 Vacuum components: Vacuum components help a wide variety of users and industries to perform automation and handling tasks. The range of products includes vacuum suction pads, vacuum generators, mounting elements and system monitors.
 Vacuum gripping systems: Schmalz designs ready-to-connect vacuum gripping systems, that are adapted to customer-specific requirements. The systems range from universal grippers to layer gripping systems and vacuum spiders. The grippers are used in all areas of automation.
 Vacuum handling systems: Ergonomic vacuum lifters facilitate manual workpiece handling. Also the vacuum lifters can be adjusted to meet a firm's specific requirements. Combined with crane systems Schmalz offers ergonomic, ready-to-connect handling devices.
 Vacuum clamping systems: Vacuum clamping technology is used with CNC machine tools in order to increase productivity and economic efficiency. Workpieces can be fixed in the machine.

Sustainability 
Renewable energy sources such as solar and wind energy, wood chips and hydro-electric power are utilized. Today, Schmalz is able to generate more energy than the company actually needs.

References

External links 
 Official Web-site

Industrial machine manufacturers
Machine tool builders
Pneumatic tool manufacturers
Technology companies of Germany
German brands
Manufacturing companies established in 1910
1910 establishments in Germany
Companies based in Baden-Württemberg
Tool manufacturing companies of Germany